Catscratch is an American animated television series created by Doug TenNapel (also known for creating the Earthworm Jim series). It aired on Nickelodeon from July 9, 2005, to February 10, 2007. It was a loose adaptation of TenNapel's comic book series, Gear, which in the series is also the name of the cats' monster truck. The series features music composed by longtime TenNapel collaborator, Terry Scott Taylor.

Description
The series revolves around a trio of anthropomorphic feline brothers. After their wealthy owner Edna Cramdilly died, she left her riches to them, along with a menacing, oversized monster truck named Gear and a dignified butler named Hovis. The program commonly chronicles their wealthy lifestyles and action-packed, sometimes paranormal experiences. Other characters include the sweet young neighbor girl, Kimberly, with whom Gordon is obsessed, and the cats' competitive rivals the Chumpy Chump Brothers.

Characters

Main
 Gordon Quid (voiced by Rob Paulsen) speaks with a Scottish accent, despite the fact he is not from Scotland, and claims to be a member of the Highland Quid Clan. He is infatuated with "Human" Kimberly and loves to sing, which quite regularly angers Mr. Blik. He enjoys cooking Scottish recipes, which many people find disgusting. He is likely a Manx cat due to his small tail, and has an orange patch on his right eye. Gordon is the middle child of the three.
 Waffle (voiced by Kevin McDonald) is the youngest and tallest of the three. A dimwitted and happy-go-lucky with an affinity for his many pet newts, his catchphrases are "Spleee!" or "Woohoo!". He is easily fascinated by many simplistic, everyday items and likes doing flatulent sounds with his underarms. He is a gray American Curl with long, floppy ears and a long tail with dark periwinkle stripes like his right ear.
 Mr. Blik (voiced by Wayne Knight) is the oldest, shortest, and the self-appointed leader of the group who is confident, pampered, surly, and vain. He often gets himself into major trouble and is prone to near-death injuries. Mr. Blik is proud of his newly inherited riches and spends his money on anything and everything that spells respect and power. He always insults his two brothers and his catchphrases are "Yeah!" and "Suckers!". He is a Bombay cat.

Supporting
 Hovis (voiced by Maurice LaMarche) is Mrs. Cramdilly's butler who looks after the cats and collects his measly paychecks (which Mr. Blik signs). Hovis is not exactly thrilled about his new situation but hails from a long line of butlers who have served in the house and honestly believes that he has nowhere else to go. Therefore, Hovis puts up with the fact that the former pets have become his masters. Mr. Blik barks out orders to him constantly, Gordon treats him as an equal, and Waffle has not quite figured out that he is not a pet anymore (though he still asks Hovis to be let out and scratched behind his ears). His birthday is April 14, 1964, as seen in the episode "Love Jackal".
 Human Kimberly (voiced by Liliana Mumy) is an 8-year-old girl who has a good-natured personality, a gap in her teeth, and an obsession with unicorns. Kimberly is one of the few human friends the cats have. Kimberly does not think they are greedy and just accepts her feline neighbors for who they are and sees the good in their hearts. Kimberly is also completely unaware of Gordon's infatuation with her. Kimberly has three human friends named Kaitlin, Kaitlyn, and Charlotte. Although she is not in many episodes, her most notable appearances are in the episodes "Unicorn Club", "Love Cats", and "Core-uption".
 Randall (voiced by Frank Welker) is an antagonistic male brown grizzly bear who is on the hunt for the three cat brothers. Randall knows where the cats live and will sometimes be at their door to eat them up as soon as it is opened.

Production
Catscratch went into production in early 2005. The series aired on Nickelodeon and premiered in the United States on July 9, 2005. The final episode entitled "Spindango Fundulation/Duck and Cover" aired on February 10, 2007, ending the series.

Episodes

Home media

Reception

Critical
Sarah Wenk of Common Sense Media gave the series 3 out of 5 stars; saying that, “Catscratch is a generic cartoon show that involves oddly drawn characters who don't really look like anything, very loud voices, very bright colors, and many instances of people and creatures and things being bashed, broken, and bonked. The show is a by-the-book program, but that doesn't mean it's not sometimes funny or even touching. Many kids will get a kick out of it, although you may not be as tolerant. There's nothing terribly wrong with it, but nothing terribly right, either.”

Awards and nominations

Comics

Confirmed by an e-mail from Doug TenNapel, there were a few 2-page Catscratch comics in the works for Nickelodeon Magazine. The first one came out in the December/January 2005 issue. The second one came out in the March 2006 issue. The third and last one was in the February 2007 issue.

See also

 Earthworm Jim
 Doug TenNapel
 Nickelodeon

References

External links

 
 Catscratch at NickAnimationStudio.com (archive)

Nicktoons
2000s American animated television series
2005 American television series debuts
2007 American television series endings
2000s Nickelodeon original programming
American children's animated comedy television series
Animated television series about brothers
Animated television series about cats
English-language television shows
Television shows set in Bakersfield, California
Television series created by Doug TenNapel